Douglas MacArthur II (July 5, 1909 – November 15, 1997) was an American diplomat. During his diplomatic career, he served as United States ambassador to Japan, Belgium, Austria, and Iran, as well as Assistant Secretary of State for Legislative Affairs. He was the nephew of the famous U.S. general Douglas MacArthur.

Early life and education
MacArthur's parents were Captain Arthur MacArthur III and Mary McCalla MacArthur. Through his mother, he was a grandson of Bowman H. McCalla, great-grandson of Colonel Horace Binney Sargent, and great-great-grandson of Lucius Manlius Sargent. Named for his uncle, General Douglas MacArthur, he was born in Bryn Mawr, Pennsylvania, in 1909.

MacArthur graduated from Milton Academy in Milton, Mass., and from Yale College, Class of 1932. He married Laura Louise Barkley on August 21, 1934, the daughter of future U.S. Vice President Alben Barkley.

Diplomatic career
After serving as an Army officer, MacArthur began his Foreign Service career in 1935 with a post in Vancouver. He was assigned to Vichy France during the early years of World War II, served as secretary of the U.S. Embassy there from 1940 to 1942, and was interned in Baden Baden, Germany with other U.S. diplomatic staff and civilians for two years after the U.S. broke relations with the Vichy government. Following an internee exchange in March 1944, he served as part of General Dwight Eisenhower's political staff, and then led the political section of the U.S. Embassy in Paris until 1948. He went on to become chief of the State Department's Division of Western European Affairs in 1949, where he assisted in the formation of NATO, and served as Counselor of the State Department from 1953 to 1956, where he led the U.S. negotiations for the SEATO treaty.

Ambassador to Japan 
MacArthur was appointed as U.S. Ambassador to Japan in December 1956, and presented his credentials in February 1957.

During his four years in Tokyo, MacArthur oversaw the re-negotiation of the U.S.-Japan Security Treaty, known as "Anpo" in Japanese. MacArthur appeared on the cover of the June 27, 1960 issue of Time magazine, in which he was characterized as "the principal architect of present-day U.S. policy toward Japan."

However, the new treaty was met with the massive Anpo Protests in Japan, and was only ratified with great difficulty. As the protests grew in size in June 1960, MacArthur summoned the heads of major newspapers and television station NHK to his office and demanded more favorable coverage of the treaty.

Then on June 10, MacArthur deliberately provoked the so-called "Hagerty Incident" (ハガチー事件, Hagachii jiken). That afternoon, MacArthur was leaving Tokyo's Haneda Airport in a black car carrying himself and President Eisenhower's press secretary James Hagerty, who had just arrived in Japan to prepare for a planned visit by Eisenhower, when MacArthur ordered that the car be deliberately driven into a large crowd of anti-treaty protesters. The mob surrounded the car and proceeded to smash the car's windows and tail lights, slash its tires, and dance on the roof until MacArthur and Hagerty finally had to be rescued by a U.S. Marines helicopter. MacArthur had hoped that by provoking the incident, he would force the Japanese government to carry out a more forceful police response to suppress the protests ahead of Eisenhower's planned arrival. However, MacArthur's gambit backfired, as widespread shock at the Hagerty Incident helped force prime minister Nobusuke Kishi to cancel Eisenhower's visit, for fears that his safety could not be guaranteed. 

It was revealed in 1974 that MacArthur had negotiated a secret agreement with Japanese foreign minister Aiichiro Fujiyama to allow the transit of American nuclear weapons through Japanese territory. It was also revealed, through documents declassified in the 2000s, that MacArthur pressured the Japanese judiciary, including Chief Justice Kōtarō Tanaka, to uphold the legality of the United States military presence in Japan after a lower court decision found it unconstitutional.

Other posts 
Following his time in Japan, MacArthur served as Ambassador to Belgium (1961–1965), Assistant Secretary of State (1965–1967), Ambassador to Austria (1967–1969) and Ambassador to Iran (1969–1972). While in the latter post, he escaped an attempted kidnapping by Iranian extremists in 1970.

Later life and death 
MacArthur died in Washington, D.C., in 1997.

See also 
 Girard incident
 Treaty of Mutual Cooperation and Security between the United States and Japan
 Anpo protests
 Hagerty Incident

References

External links
 1982 interview with Ambassador MacArthur related to US diplomatic efforts related to Vietnam

1909 births
1997 deaths
People from Bryn Mawr, Pennsylvania
Military personnel from Pennsylvania
American people of Scottish descent
Ambassadors of the United States to Austria
Ambassadors of the United States to Belgium
Ambassadors of the United States to Iran
Ambassadors of the United States to Japan
United States Career Ambassadors
Douglas II
Barkley family
Yale College alumni
Yale University alumni
American prisoners of war in World War II
Milton Academy alumni
United States Foreign Service personnel
20th-century American diplomats